The Chinese ferret-badger (Melogale moschata), also known as the small-toothed ferret-badger is a member of the Mustelidae, and widely distributed in Southeast Asia. It is listed as Least Concern on the IUCN Red List and considered tolerant of modified habitat.

The Chinese ferret-badger is densely distributed from Northeast India north to Central China south to northern Indochina. The Formosan ferret-badger (M. subaurantiaca) of Taiwan was formerly considered conspecific, but is now thought to be a distinct species.

Description

Distinctive mask-like face markings distinguish the Chinese ferret-badger from most other oriental mustelids, although the other members of the genus Melogale have similar facial markings.

Distribution and habitat 
The Chinese ferret-badger lives in grassland, open forests, and tropical rainforests from northeast India to southern China, including Hainan Island, and south to Hong Kong and northern Indochina. They tolerate human disturbance well, and temporarily reside in agricultural areas such as rice paddies, soybean, cotton, or grass fields.

The ferret badger acclimates well to areas of human habitation, taking advantage of human-made sites suitable as resting spots, such as firewood stacks and rock piles, and using farmland and vegetable gardens as feeding sites. Ferret badgers create limited conflicts with surrounding human populations, as they rarely prey on chickens or livestock, and tend to not damage property.

Behaviour and ecology

The Chinese ferret-badger is active at dusk and at night. It is a good climber. When alarmed it emits foul-smelling anal secretions. It rests during the day in burrows, such as small rodents' dens, or natural formations, such as rock crevices. They also construct makeshift shelters in shallow depressions in the ground.

The home ranges of male and female ferret badgers overlap, suggesting a lack of territoriality between members of the species. Despite their small home ranges, however, ferret badgers are relatively nomadic creatures, moving from one resting spot to the next without establishing permanent residence. Ferret badgers may establish single-use resting spots, or choose to inhabit a particular place for a period of several days.

Diet
The Chinese ferret-badger feeds on fruit, insects, small animals, and worms. Earthworms, amphibians and insects are important components of its diet. It also eats fleshy fruits such as of Chinese plum, oriental raisin tree, date-plum and Chinese kiwi.

Reproduction
Chinese ferret-badgers mate in March. The female gives birth to a litter of up to three young in May or June. The new-borns are blind and well-furred, with the same colour pattern as the adults. Their eyes open at about two weeks of age.

Diseases  
The Chinese ferret-badger is associated with reported outbreaks of human rabies in southeastern China, which were first reported in 1997 and the most recent case in 2008. There have been no reported deaths in these cases; however, there is currently no rabies vaccine for ferret-badgers.

Threats
Ferret badgers are among the most hunted fur-bearing animals in Southern China, but maintain relatively high population densities in part due to their nearly-inedible meat and the low prices of their pelts.

References

Melogale
Mammals of India
Mammals described in 1831
Taxa named by John Edward Gray